HMS Duchess was a D-class destroyer built for the Royal Navy in the early 1930s. The ship was initially assigned to the Mediterranean Fleet before she was transferred to the China Station in early 1935. She was temporarily deployed in the Red Sea during late 1935 during the Abyssinia Crisis, before returning to her duty station where she remained until mid-1939. Duchess was transferred back to the Mediterranean Fleet just before the Second World War began in September 1939. While escorting the battleship  back to the British Isles, she was accidentally rammed by the battleship in thick fog and sank with heavy loss of life on 12 December 1939.

Description
Steam for the turbines was provided by three Admiralty 3-drum water-tube boilers. The ship's complement was 145 officers and men.

The ship mounted four 45-calibre QF 4.7-inch Mk IX guns in single mounts. For anti-aircraft (AA) defence, Duchess had a single 12-pounder (3-inch (76.2 mm)) gun and two quadruple Mk I mounts for the 0.5-inch Vickers Mk III machine gun. She was fitted with two above-water quadruple torpedo tube mounts for  torpedoes. One depth charge rail and two throwers were fitted; 20 depth charges were originally carried, but this increased to 35 shortly after the war began.

Service and collision
Duchess was ordered on 2 February 1931 under the 1930 Naval Estimates and was laid down at the yards of the Palmers Shipbuilding and Iron Company, Jarrow, County Durham on 12 June 1931. She was launched on 19 July 1932 and commissioned on 24 January 1933, at a total cost of £229,367, excluding equipment supplied by the Admiralty, such as weapons, ammunition and wireless equipment. The ship was initially assigned to the 1st Destroyer Flotilla in the Mediterranean and made a brief deployment to the Persian Gulf and the Red Sea in September–November 1933. Upon her return, her superheaters were repaired at Malta between 18 December and 6 January 1934. She was given a refit at Chatham Dockyard from 3 September to 23 October to prepare the ship for service on the China Station.

Duchess arrived in Hong Kong in January 1935 where she joined the 8th Destroyer Flotilla. The ship was attached to the Mediterranean Fleet in the Red Sea from September to November during the Abyssinian Crisis. She made a number of goodwill visits during her time on the station as well as conducting anti-piracy patrols. During a typhoon at Hong Kong on 2 September 1937, a merchant ship crushed Duchesss stern when it dragged its anchors. Her repairs were not completed until 14 October.

The ship remained on the station until late August 1939, when the imminent start of the Second World War caused the Admiralty to order her to take up her war station with the Mediterranean Fleet at Malta. Duchess arrived there on 12 October and remained in the Mediterranean for the next two months. During the morning of 12 December, Barham collided with Duchess off the Mull of Kintyre in heavy fog. The destroyer capsized and her depth charges exploded, killing 136 of her crew including her commanding officer, Lieutenant Commander Robert C. M. White, who was trapped in his sea cabin when the sliding door jammed.

Notes

References

External links
HMS Duchess at Uboat.net
HMS Duchess's wartime service on naval-history.net

 

Ships built on the River Tyne
C and D-class destroyers
World War II destroyers of the United Kingdom
1932 ships
Maritime incidents in December 1939
Ships sunk in collisions
World War II shipwrecks in the Irish Sea
Maritime incidents in Scotland
History of Argyll and Bute
1939 disasters in the United Kingdom